Kirrawee High School is a comprehensive co-educational high school located in Kirrawee, New South Wales, Australia, adjacent to the Royal National Park.

The school was opened in 1966 and now caters for around 1,200 students, most continuing their education from three local primary schools, Gymea Bay, Grays Point and Kirrawee. The school is a Languages High School which also offers a comprehensive education in sports and in the performing arts, with musician James Morrison, who plays a concert at the school every year, a close mentor for the school's Jazz Orchestra.

In the Sutherland Cronulla Education District, Kirrawee High school was second only to the academic selective high school Caringbah High School.

Extra-curricular activities offered include debating and public speaking, musical and dramatic productions, the Student Council, community service, charitable collections and fund raising and many sports programs.  Brett McKay, the head science teacher, has been awarded the Prime Minister's Prize for Excellence in Science Teaching.

See also 
 List of government schools in New South Wales
 Education in Australia

Notable alumni 
 Ruby Fields - Australian singer-songwriter and guitarist. 
Larissa Behrendt - Indigenous academic, lawyer and writer. NSW Australian of the Year 2011
 Michael Dickson- NFL Punter, Seattle Seahawks
 Alicia McCormack- Olympic bronze medalist, Beijing 2008 water polo and London 2012 water polo
 Chris McCormack – twice World Ironman Triathlon champion
 Kirsten Thomson – Olympic silver medalist, Sydney 2000 swimming
 Jackson Fear - Olympic archer, Atlanta 1996
 Emma Pask – jazz vocalist
 Kate Hollywood-  Olympic hockey player and dual Commonwealth Games gold medalist
 Nicola Zagame- Olympic bronze medalist, London 2012 water polo
 Lena Mihailović- Olympian at the 2021 Olympics for water polo. Her father Predrag was also the coach of the side.
 Saya Sakakibara - Tokyo 2020 Olympian in BMX Racing. AusCycling's Female BMX Racing Rider of the Year in 2020

References

External links 
 Kirrawee High School website

Sutherland Shire
Public high schools in Sydney
1966 establishments in Australia
Educational institutions established in 1966